The Iola Gasbags were a minor league baseball team based in Iola, Kansas. Between 1902 and 1906, Iola teams played as a member of the Missouri Valley League from 1902 to 1904 and the 1906 Kansas State League. The Iola Gasbags won the 1904 Missouri State League championship, before adopting the Iola "Grays" nickname for the 1906 Kansas State League season. The Iola teams hosted home minor league games at Riverside Park.

History
In 1901, the independent Missouri Valley League was formed an eight-team league without an Iola franchise.

In 1902, the Iola "Gasbags" began play in the Class D level Missouri Valley League. The Fort Scott Giants, Nevada Lunatics and Joplin Miners teams continued league play from the previous season. The Iola Gasbags, Coffeyville Indians, Jefferson City Convicts, Sedalia Gold Bugs and Springfield Reds teams all joined as new members, with the league beginning play on May 6, 1902.

The Iola "Gasbags" team nickname corresponds to the local oil and gas industry. In 1895, natural gas pools were discovered in the Iola area, increasing the population from 1,500 to over 11,000 in nine years, before the natural gas reserves waned. Today, Iola remains home to oil and gas exploration and industry production.

The Gasbags finished a distant last in the final standings after their first season of play in the Missouri Valley League. The league held no playoffs. With a record of 34-90, playing the season under managers Harry Rand, Jimmie Driscoll and Harry Meek, Iola finished 54.0 games behind the first place Nevada Lunatics in the final standings.

In 1903, Iola continued Missouri Valley League play and were known under the slightly altered "Gaslighters" nickname for one season. The same eight teams remained in the league from the previous season, beginning league play on May 15, 1903.

The Iola Gaslighters placed third in the 1903 Missouri Valley League standings. The Coal Diggers ended the 1903 season with a record of 79–52 as A.H. Harris served as manager. After Nevada and Leavenworth folded during the season, Iola placed third of the six remaining teams, ending the season 6.0 games behind the 1st place Sedalia Goldbugs, who finished with a record of 86–47.

The Iola "Gasbags" played a final Missouri Valley League season in 1904, winning the league championship as the league became a Class C level League with eight teams. Iola ended the season with a record of 83–41, placing first in the standings, with manager Dud Risley leading the team to the championsiip. Iola finished 5.5 games ahead of the second place Springfield Midgets.

Despite winning the championship the previous season, the Iola franchise did not return to the 1905 Missouri Valley League. The league reformed, as only the Pittsburg and Fort Scott franchises were retained in the league. The Missouri Valley League then permanently folded after completing the 1905 season.

After the Missouri Valley League folded following the 1905 season, Iola joined the Class D level Kansas State League in 1906, with the franchise relocating during the season. The Iola "Grays" joined the Bartlesville Indians, Chanute Browns, Coffeyville Bricks, Fort Scott Giants, Independence Coyotes, Parsons Preachers and Pittsburg Champs in beginning league play on May 3, 1906.

On June 15, 1906, the Iola Grays moved to Cherryvale, Kansas to become the Cherryvale Boosters, with the team ending the Kansas League season in second place. The Iola/Cherryvale team of the Kansas State League ended their 1906 season with a record of 62–50, as Dan Durand, Fred Hobart and Billy Burns served as managers covering in both locations. The Kansas State League did not return to play in 1907.

Iola next hosted the 1908 Iola Champs, who played the season as members of the Oklahoma-Kansas League .

The ballpark
The Iola teams hosted minor league home games at Riverside Municipal Ballpark, which lies within Riverside Park. The current ballpark was a Works Project Administration project after longtime use at the site. The ballpark and adjacent park grounds are still in use today. The ballpark with a track and stands is utilized by Iola's USD 257 school district sports teams. The park is located at 418 Park Avenue and South State Street in Iola.

Timeline

Year–by–year records

Notable alumni

George Gillpatrick (1902)
Roy Hartzell (1902)
Gus Hetling (1903)
Jack Killilay (1906)
Larry Milton (1904)

See also
Iola Gasbags playersIola Grays players

References

External links
Iola - Baseball Reference

Defunct minor league baseball teams
Defunct baseball teams in Kansas
Defunct Missouri Valley League teams
Baseball teams established in 1902
Baseball teams disestablished in 1904
Allen County, Kansas